Kevin Siegfried (born 1969) is an American composer. He has been composer-in-residence with the Capitol Hill Chorale since 2014, and teaches at the Boston Conservatory at Berklee.

Life and career
Siegfried earned his bachelor's degree at Antioch College. He then attended the University of Iowa, where he received a master's degree in theory and composition; among his professors was Donald Martin Jenni.  He completed a doctorate in composition at the New England Conservatory of Music, where his instructors included Lee Hyla, Michael Gandolfi, and Daniel Pinkham. He also studied in France and in India, where he received a Stanley Fellowship to study South Indian classical music with Sriram Parasuram. He has received grants and awards from ASCAP, the National Endowment for the Arts, and the New Hampshire State Council on the Arts, among other organizations. He currently lives in Andover, Massachusetts. At the Boston Conservatory at Berklee, he is a Professor of Theater, and Coordinator of Theory and New Works. In 2017, he was the winner of Berklee's Distinguished Faculty Award.

Siegfried is especially noted for his work with the music of the Shakers, which he first encountered in 1995 during a visit to the Shaker village at Pleasant Hill, Kentucky. He has since produced many choral arrangements of Shaker songs, and has composed a cantata, Angel of Light, for which they served as a basis. He has been associated for some time with Canterbury Shaker Village in New Hampshire, and Sabbathday Lake Shaker Village in Maine, as of 2017 the home of the last living Shakers. Siegfried's arrangements of Shaker music have been recorded by the Tudor Choir and the Dale Warland Singers. He has also written works for the Nashua Symphony Orchestra in Nashua, New Hampshire.

Siegfried's music is published by G. Schirmer, E. C. Schirmer, Earthsongs, MorningStar, and Trinitas.

Works
Siegfried's works include:

Selected choral works
Shaker Songs (1998) for SATB choir
Media Vita (2000) for SSATB choir
At the Water's Edge (2004) for SATB choir and harp
Three English Carols (2007) for SATB choir ("There is no rose", "I syng of a mayden", "Adam lay ybounden")
Songs for the Journey (2010) for soprano, SATB choir, 2 horns, harp, organ, and low strings
Three Horizons (2010) for SATB choir and piano
Child of Earth (2011) cantata in 5 movements for mezzo-soprano, SATB choir, harp, and string orchestra
Annunciation (2012) for SATB choir
Conditor alme siderum (2014) for SATB choir
Angel of Light (2015) cantata in 7 movements for soprano and SATB choir
Vidimus Stellam (2016) Christmas cantata in 5 movements for SATB choir and brass quintet
Music of the Spheres (2017) for SATB choir and glass armonica
Appalachian Carols (2017) for SATB choir (based on the music of Jean Ritchie)

Selected chamber music
Square One (2002) for 4 marimbas
Arcs and Circles (2003) for piano
Tracing a Wheel on Water (2003) for guitar
Musica Sacra (2004) 3 movements for string orchestra
Cradle Song (2007) for guitar
Land of Pure Delight (2014) – Shaker songs and dances for string quartet

References

External links
Official website

1969 births
Living people
American male composers
Choral composers
20th-century American composers
21st-century American composers
Antioch College alumni
University of Iowa alumni
New England Conservatory alumni
Boston Conservatory at Berklee faculty
20th-century American male musicians
21st-century American male musicians